Frank Coulston (born 5 October 1942) is a Scottish former footballer who played for Partick Thistle, Stranraer, and Stenhousemuir in the Scottish Football League in the 1960s and 1970s. Coulston was part of the Partick Thistle side that surprisingly won the Scottish League Cup Final by 4–1 against Celtic in 1971.

References

1942 births
Living people
Scottish footballers
People from Stranraer
Association football forwards
Scottish Football League players
Queen's Park F.C. players
Stranraer F.C. players
Partick Thistle F.C. players
Stenhousemuir F.C. players
Falkirk F.C. non-playing staff